Achab may refer to:

 Achab or Ahab, ancient Israelite king
 Capitaine Achab, French short film directed by Philippe Ramos
 Imad Achab Kanouni, French citizen who was held in extrajudicial detention in the United States Guantanamo Bay detention camps, in Cuba
 Jaouad Achab, taekwondo practitioner from Belgium
 Mustapha Achab, Moroccan footballer.

See also 

 Ahab (disambiguation)
 Captain Ahab (disambiguation)